Beverley Brook is a minor English river  long in south-west London. It rises in Worcester Park and joins the River Thames to the north of Putney Embankment at Barn Elms.

Course
Beverley Brook rises at the top of a hill in a shady area at Cuddington Recreation Ground in Worcester Park then flows north in a culvert under the A2043 road, emerging in waste land next to Worcester Park Station. It then flows northeast through Motspur Park, New Malden, Wimbledon Common, Richmond Park, forms the brief boundary of East Sheen and Roehampton near Priest's Bridge, flows through the south of Barnes (bounding the Barnes playing fields to the north and Putney Common to the south) and joins the River Thames above Putney Embankment between Barn Elms, Barnes and Leader's Gardens, Putney.

Uses

Beverley Brook creates a water feature used by deer, smaller animals and water grasses and some water lilies in Richmond Park (where it is followed by the Tamsin Trail and Beverley Walk).

Except for the playing fields, the whole of the common, including Beverley Brook, is both a Site of Special Scientific Interest (SSSI) and a Special Area of Conservation (SAC). Towards the south (upstream) end of the common, Fishpond Wood and Beverley Meads nature reserve lies a few metres east of the stream.

South of Wimbledon Common, the stretch of the A3 running near the stream is named Beverley Way after it.

Etymology
The name is derived from the former presence in the river of the European beaver (Castor fiber), a species extinct in Britain since the sixteenth century.  The Middle English word for beaver was bever, the word for meadow was ley (or lei or various other spellings, still rarely used today as lea) and brook meant stream, as it does today.  Beverley Brook was thus the Beaver-Meadow Stream.

Tributaries 

It flows from Sutton through Lower Morden to join it at Beverley Park in New Malden. Both brooks are on the Environment Agency's watchlist of rivers susceptible to flooding.

Environmental improvements
For much of the twentieth century Beverley Brook was joined by poorly treated sewage from a sewage works in Green Lane, Worcester Park. Since some pipe redirection enabling the removing of the works and the introduction of improved treatment methods in 1998, the range of wildlife species in the river has steadily increased.

At Wimbledon Common, Beverley Brook has banks reinforced with wooden "toe-boarding", which prevents use by water voles, and there is scope for further such improvements.

In fiction
Beverley Brook is a regular character in the Ben Aaronovitch series of urban fantasy police procedural novels Rivers of London. She describes her kind thus: "'Orisa', said Beverley. 'We're Orisa. Not spirits, not local geniuses – Orisa'."

See also 
Tributaries of the River Thames
List of rivers of England

References

External links

 Beverley Brook Catchment
 Royal Parks press release on the improving water quality of the river, 1 January 2004
 The Beverley Brook waymarked walk 
 Beverley Brook Walk
 Beverley Brook Walk map
 Flow measurements

Geography of the Royal Borough of Kingston upon Thames
Geography of the London Borough of Merton
Geography of the London Borough of Richmond upon Thames
Geography of the London Borough of Sutton
Geography of the London Borough of Wandsworth
Putney
Richmond Park
Rivers of London
1BeverleyBrook